Bartholomew Township, Arkansas may refer to:

 Bartholomew Township, Drew County, Arkansas
 Bartholomew Township, Lincoln County, Arkansas

See also 
 List of townships in Arkansas

Arkansas township disambiguation pages